The Midlands/Wales/West Division of the 2009 Twenty20 Cup determined which counties would qualify for the knockout stage of the 2009 Twenty20 Cup. Northamptonshire and Warwickshire qualified automatically, while Somerset qualified as the best of the third-place finishers.

Table

Matches

25 May

27 May

29 May

30 May

1 June

3 June

4 June

22 June

23 June

24 June

25 June

26 June

28 June

References

Twenty20 Cup Midlands Wales West Division